(1906 - 24 November 1945) was the third son of Gichin Funakoshi (船越 義珍) (the founder of Shōtōkan 松濤館流 karate) and is widely credited with developing the foundation of the modern karate Shotokan style.

Early years
Gigo Funakoshi was born in Okinawa and diagnosed with tuberculosis at the age of seven. He was sickly as a child and began the formal study of karate-do at the age of twelve as a means to improve his health. In the early years, Gichin Funakoshi often took Gigo with him to his trainings with Yasutsune Itosu. Gigo moved from Okinawa to Tokyo with his father when he was 17, and later became a radiographer of the Section of Physical and Medical Consultation of the Ministry of Education.

Career
When his father's Shihan (senior assistant instructor) Takeshi Shimoda died, Gigo assumed his position within the Shotokan organization teaching in various universities. Gichin Funakoshi transformed karate from a purely self-defense fighting technique to a philosophical martial Dō (way of life), or gendai budo, but his son Gigō began to develop a karate technique that definitively separated Japanese karate-do from the local Okinawan arts.  Between 1936 and 1945, Gigo gave it a completely different and powerful Japanese flavor based on his study of modern kendo (the way of the japanese sword), and Iaido (the way of drawing the japanese sword) under sensei Nakayama Hakudō. Gigo's work on japanese Karate development was primarily popularized by masters Shigeru Egami and Genshin Hironishi, who later formed the shotokai karate style

Changes in style 
Through his teaching position and understanding of Japanese martial arts, Gigō became the technical creator of modern shotokan karate. In 1946 the book Karate Do Nyumon by Gigo and Gichin Funakoshi was released. Gigo had written the technical part, whereas his father Gichin wrote the preamble and historical parts.

While the ancient arts of To-de and shuri-te emphasized the use and development of the upper body, open hand attacks, short distances, joint locks, basic grappling, pressure point striking and use of the front kick and variations of it, Gigō developed long distance striking techniques using the low stances found in old style kendo and Iaido kata. Gigo also developed higher kicks including mawashi geri (round kick), yoko geri kekomi (thrusting side kick), yoko geri keage (side snap kick), fumikiri (cutting side kick directed to soft targets), ura mawashi geri (quarter rotation front-round kick—though some credit Kase-sensei with the creation of this technique) and ushiro geri kekomi (thrusting back kick) by referring to the foot technique of savate. Yoshitaka was especially known for his deep stances and kicking techniques, and he introduced fudo dachi (rooted stance/immovable stance), yoko geri (side kick), and mae geri (front kick) forms to the Shotokan style. All these techniques became part of the already large arsenal brought from the ancient Okinawan styles. Another big changement of Gigo was the introduction of the Kiba Dachi instead of Shiko Dachi and implementing the Kokutsu Dachi (which he took from japanese classical fencing or "kenjutsu") instead of Neko Ashi Dachi stance in Shotokan Kata.

Gigo's kicking techniques were performed with a much higher knee-lift than in previous styles, and the use of the hips was emphasized. Other technical developments included the turning of the torso to a half-facing position (hanmi) when blocking, and thrusting the rear leg and hips when performing the techniques. These adaptations allowed the delivery of a penetrating attack with the whole body through correct body alignment. Gigo also promoted free sparring.

Gigō's kumite (fighting) style was to strike hard and fast, using low stances and long attacks, chained techniques and foot sweeps (taken from old style Kendo and Judo). Integration of these changes into the Shotokan style immediately separated Shotokan from Okinawan karate. Gigo also emphasized the use of oi tsuki (lunge punch) and gyaku tsuki (reverse lunge punch). The training sessions in his dojo were exhausting, and during these, Gigo expected his students to give twice as much energy as they would put into a real confrontation. He expected this over-training would prepare them for an actual combat situation, should it arise.

Final years
The difficult living conditions of World War II weakened Gigo, but he continued training.  He died of tuberculosis at the age of 39 on 24 November 1945, in Tokyo, Japan.

See also 
 Shōtōkai
 Gichin Funakoshi
 kendo
 Iaido
 shotokan

External links 
 Biography on www.shotokai.com

References

1906 births
1945 deaths
Okinawan male karateka
20th-century deaths from tuberculosis
Tuberculosis deaths in Japan